Carbon County Regional Airport , is a publicly owned airport 3 miles east of downtown Price, in Carbon County, Utah.

Cargo destination

References

External links 

Airports in Utah